Leslie Johnson (June 20, 1933 – August 22, 2018), better known as Lazy Lester, was an American blues musician who sang and played the harmonica and guitar. In a career spanning the 1950s to 2018, he pioneered swamp blues, and also played harmonica blues, rhythm and blues and Louisiana blues.

Best known for regional hits recorded with Ernie Young's Nashville-based Excello Records, Lester also contributed to songs recorded by other Excello artists, including Slim Harpo, Lightnin' Slim, and Katie Webster. Cover versions of his songs have been recorded by (among others) the Kinks, the Flamin' Groovies, Freddy Fender, Dwight Yoakam, Dave Edmunds, Raful Neal, Anson Funderburgh, and the Fabulous Thunderbirds. In the comeback stage of his career (since the late 1980s) he recorded new albums backed by Mike Buck, Sue Foley, Gene Taylor, Kenny Neal, Lucky Peterson, and Jimmie Vaughan.

Biography 
Leslie Johnson started playing the guitar around age 11 and began performing in his teens around Baton Rouge with Raful Neal, later co-founding the Rhythm Rockers. In the mid-1950s, Lester was on the margins of the Louisiana blues scene. According to Rolling Stone (February 2006), Buddy Guy, before moving to Chicago, had played in Louisiana with some of the old masters: Lightnin' Hopkins, Lazy Lester, Slim Harpo. When Guy left for Chicago, in 1957, Lester replaced him, on guitar, in a local band – even though Lester, at that time, did not own such an instrument.

Lester's career took off when he found a seat next to Lightnin' Slim on a bus transporting Slim to an Excello recording session. At the studio, the scheduled harmonica player did not appear. Slim and Lester spent the afternoon unsuccessfully trying to find him, when Lester volunteered that he could play the harmonica. Lester's work on that first Lightnin' Slim session led the producer, Jay Miller, to record Lester as solo artist and also to use him as a multi-instrumentalist on percussion, guitar, bass, and harmonica in sessions headlined by other artists whose recordings were produced by Miller, including, notably, Slim Harpo. 'Percussion' on these sessions went beyond the traditional drum kit and included a rolled-up newspaper striking a cardboard box. Miller dubbed Lester "Lazy Lester" because of his laconic, laid-back style.

More than his vocal delivery, Lester is best remembered for songs that were later covered by a wide range of rock, country, blues, and Tex-Mex stars, chiefly, "I'm a Lover Not a Fighter," "I Hear You Knockin'," and "Sugar Coated Love".

Lester stated that he wrote these songs, but almost all are credited to Miller or to Lester and Miller. Lester also stated he received few royalties, which embittered him and made him skeptical of the music industry. By the late 1960s, he had given up on the music industry, working manual labor and pursuing his favorite hobby – fishing. Lester eventually moved to Pontiac, Michigan, living with Slim Harpo's sister.

In 1971, Fred Reif set up a Lightnin' Slim concert at the University of Chicago Folk Festival, and Lester was brought up from Louisiana to accompany him. A few weeks after that performance, Lester was back in Louisiana. Years later, Reif and Lester were both in Michigan, from where Reif orchestrated a comeback. Lester recorded and played around the United States and abroad, backed by blues bands, including, frequently, Loaded Dice.

Lester's recordings in this period were on blues labels Alligator and Telarc, alongside releases in Europe.

In September 2002, he was presented with a Lifetime Achievement Award by the Boston Blues Society.

In 2003, Martin Scorsese included Lester in his blues tribute concert at Radio City Music Hall, a record of which was released as the film and album Lightning in A Bottle. The group photograph inside the album depicted Lester grinning, dead-center among peers and musical progeny including B.B. King, Solomon Burke, Clarence "Gatemouth" Brown, Buddy Guy, Levon Helm, Chuck D, the Neville Brothers, Dr. John, John Fogerty, and Aerosmith.

Lester lived in Paradise, California, with his girlfriend., and appeared in the 2015 documentary film I Am the Blues.

Lester continued to perform nationally and abroad into 2018, often returning to Louisiana where he regularly shared the stage with Lil' Buck Sinegal, Carol Fran, and Kenny Neal. In the same year, he appeared and performed in a television commercial aired nationally for Geico Insurance.

Lester died of cancer on August 22, 2018, at the age of 85.

Selected discography 
 True Blues – 1967, Excello LP
 Lazy Lester Rides Again – 1987, King Snake
 Harp & Soul – 1988, Alligator (featuring Lucky Peterson, Kenny Neal)
 Lazy Lester – 1989, Flyright (France) (previously unreleased Excello session takes from the 1960s)
 I'm a Lover Not a Fighter – 1994, Excello/Ace
 I Hear You Knockin''' – 1994, Excello/AVI
 All Over You – 1998, Antone's (recorded 1997 – featuring Derek O'Brien, Sue Foley, Sarah Brown)
 Lazy Lester – 2000, (6-song audiophile 12" EP), APO (recorded October 12–13 – featuring Henry Gray, Jimmy D. Lane)
 Superharps II – 2001, Telarc (co-billed with Carey Bell, Raful Neal, Snooky Pryor)
 Blues Stop Knockin'  – 2001, Antone's (featuring Jimmie Vaughan)
 Blues On My Radio – 2004, SWMAF (featuring Louisiana Red)
 Family Meeting – 2008, Ruf – double album by Wentus Blues Band
 One More Once – 2010, Karonte/Cambaya (Produced by Mike Vernon)
 You Better Listen – 2011, Bluestown (recorded in Notodden, Norway)
 "New Orleans" (featuring Maurice 'Big Mo' Huffman) on Big Mo's album Torn'' – 2011

See also 
The Southern Legends Entertainment & Performing Arts Hall of Fame
San Francisco Blues Festival
List of swamp blues musicians
List of harmonica blues musicians
List of harmonicists
Music of Louisiana
Blues harp

References

External links 

 2014 Blues Masters at the Crossroads performance accompanied by Marquise Knox
Lazy Lester talks about the guitar being the love of his life – NAMM Oral History Library (2006)
 (IT) Lazy Lester, I Hear You Knockin'
 (IT) Lazy Lester, Blues Stop Knockin'

1933 births
2018 deaths
20th-century African-American musicians
American blues guitarists
American male guitarists
American blues harmonica players
American blues singers
American male singers
Songwriters from Louisiana
Harmonica blues musicians
Singers from Louisiana
Swamp blues musicians
Blues musicians from Louisiana
People from Pointe Coupee Parish, Louisiana
People from Paradise, California
Guitarists from Louisiana
20th-century American guitarists
Alligator Records artists
Excello Records artists
Deaths from stomach cancer
Deaths from cancer in California
20th-century American male musicians
American male songwriters